Jesús Alberto Angulo Uriarte (born 30 January 1998) is a Mexican professional footballer who plays as a defender for Liga MX club Tigres UANL.

Club career

Santos Laguna
Angulo would receive his first appearance with Santos Laguna on 16 September 2018 in a league match against Cruz Azul, coming in for Ventura Alvarado at the 61st minute, where Santos lost 2–1.

International career

Youth
Angulo was called up by Jaime Lozano to participate with the under-22 team at the 2019 Toulon Tournament, where Mexico won third place at the tournament.

Angulo participated at the 2020 CONCACAF Olympic Qualifying Championship, where Mexico won the competition. He was subsequently called up to participate in the 2020 Summer Olympics. Angulo won the bronze medal with the Olympic team.

Senior
Angulo was called up by the interim national team manager Ricardo Ferretti for September friendlies against Uruguay and the United States. He would earn his first cap in the match against Uruguay where Mexico lost 4–1.

In October 2022, Angulo was named in Mexico's preliminary 31-man squad by manager Gerardo Martino for the World Cup, but did not make the final 26.

Career statistics

Club

International

Honours
Santos Laguna
Liga MX: Clausura 2018

Atlas
Liga MX: Apertura 2021

Mexico U23
CONCACAF Olympic Qualifying Championship: 2020
Olympic Bronze Medal: 2020

Individual
Liga MX All-Star: 2022

References

External links

1998 births
Living people
Mexico international footballers
Association football defenders
Santos Laguna footballers
Atlas F.C. footballers
Liga MX players
Liga Premier de México players
Tercera División de México players
Sportspeople from Culiacán
Footballers from Sinaloa
Footballers at the 2020 Summer Olympics
Olympic footballers of Mexico
Olympic medalists in football
Olympic bronze medalists for Mexico
Medalists at the 2020 Summer Olympics
Mexican footballers